Rokot ( meaning Rumble or Boom), also transliterated Rockot, was a Soviet Union (later Russian) space launch vehicle that was capable of launching a payload of  into a  Earth orbit with 63° inclination. It was based on the UR-100N (SS-19 Stiletto) intercontinental ballistic missile (ICBM), supplied and operated by Khrunichev State Research and Production Space Center. The first launches started in the 1990s from Baikonur Cosmodrome out of a silo. Later commercial launches commenced from Plesetsk Cosmodrome using a launch ramp specially rebuilt from one for the Kosmos-3M launch vehicle. The cost of the launcher itself was about US$15 million in 1999; The contract with European Space Agency (ESA) for launching Swarm in September 2013 was worth €27.1 million (US$36 million).

Specifications 
Rokot's total mass was 107 tonnes, its length 29 metres and its maximum diameter 2.5 metres. The liquid-fueled launch vehicle comprised three stages. The lower two were based on the Soviet UR-100N ICBM; the first stage used an RD-0233 / RD-0234 engine complex, while the second stage used an RD-0235. The third stage was a Briz-KM ( meaning Breeze-KM), which has a mass of about 6 tonnes when fuelled, and is capable of flying for 7 hours and reigniting its engine six times during flight, allowing different satellites to be placed into different orbits. All stages used Unsymmetrical dimethylhydrazine (UDMH) (unsymmetrical Dimethylhydrazine) as fuel and dinitrogen tetroxide (N2O4) as oxidiser. The Strela is a similar rocket, also based on the SS-19.

History 

The first suborbital test launch succeeded on 20 November 1990 from Baikonur Cosmodrome. On 26 December 1994, Rokot brought its first satellite into Earth orbit. In 1995, Khrunichev State Research and Production Space Center formed a company with German DaimlerBenz Aerospace to market Rokot launches for commercial use. Later, the company was renamed to Eurockot Launch Services. Eurockot bought 45 Rokots from the Russian strategic missile forces to build its inventory. In 2000, Eurokot was partly bought by the German company Astrium GmbH, a shareholder of Arianespace. Astrium then held 51% of Eurockot's shares, while Khrunichev held 49%.

Although there are several silos in Baikonur capable of launching Rokots, it was decided to build an open, non-siloed launch pad at Plesetsk Cosmodrome instead. This is because of concerns that the amount of noise generated during a silo-based launch would damage satellites. In the new pad, Rokot was wheeled up to the structure in a vertical position, and then embraced by its launch tower. The payload was lifted by a crane and placed on top of the bottom two stages. The procedure was in contrast to other Russian launchers, which had traditionally been assembled horizontally and then transferred to the launch site via railways. The first launch from Plesetsk took place on 16 May 2000.

After six entirely successful launches, a launch failure occurred on 8 October 2005, leading to the loss of the European Space Agency's CryoSat spacecraft. The launch vehicle 2nd stage main engine was not shut down properly, resulting in a catastrophic failure and automatic termination of the launch mission by the on-board computer. The payload was lost. After the failed CryoSat launch, all Rokot launches were suspended until the failure was identified. The root cause was unambiguously identified; it was a failure in programming of the Briz-KM (which was contracted to the company JSC "Khartron"). The failure of this high-profile mission led to major reforms in Khrunichev: the director of the company Alexander Medvedev was dismissed, new launch procedures were introduced, the lines of management were straightened out to catch errors and the new Khrunichev chief, Viktor Nesterov, was required to report directly to the head of the Russian Space Agency, Anatoli Perminov. Corrective measures for Rokot's return-to-flight were implemented for the South Korean KOMPSAT-2 Earth observation satellite launch which took place successfully on 28 July 2006. The Korean side reportedly praised the level of service they received, encouraging the Rokot team to rebuild its order book.

Another launch failure occurred in February 2011, when a Briz-KM malfunction  resulted in the Geo-IK-2 No.11 (Kosmos-2470) satellite being placed into a lower orbit than planned.

The Rokot version with a Ukrainian control system stopped flying after 2019, due to Ukraine's ban on technology exports to Russia. Rokot had its final flight on 26 December 2019. A fully Russian-made Rokot light carrier rocket, named Rokot-M, may begin operations as soon as 2024. The Rokot-M launch vehicle is intended for the Russian defense department.

Launch history

See also 
 Comparison of orbital launchers families

References

External links 

Website of Khrunichev State Research and Production Space Center, Launch Service Provider
Rockot history on RussianSpaceWeb.com

Space launch vehicles of Russia
Universal Rocket (rocket family)
Space launch vehicles of the Soviet Union
Vehicles introduced in 1990